Olivier Maxime Boscagli (18 November 1997) is a French professional footballer who plays as a defender for PSV Eindhoven. Born in Monaco, he has represented France at the under-17 to under-20 level.

Club career
Boscagli is a youth exponent from OGC Nice. He made his Ligue 1 debut on 25 April 2015 against Stade Rennais playing the first 84 minutes in a 2–1 away defeat. He scored his first goal in Nice's 1–0 win over Montpellier on 18 December, thereby becoming the youngest player to score in the Ligue 1 in the 2015–16 season.

International career
Although born in Monaco, Boscagli represents France at international level due to the Monaco national team not being a member of UEFA or FIFA. He represented France at the under-17, under-18, under-19 and under-20 levels.

Career statistics

Honours
PSV Eindhoven
 Johan Cruyff Shield: 2021

France U19
 UEFA European Under-19 Championship: 2016

References

External links
 Profile at the PSV Eindhoven website
 
 

1997 births
Living people
Monegasque footballers
French footballers
Association football defenders
OGC Nice players
Nîmes Olympique players
PSV Eindhoven players
Ligue 1 players
Ligue 2 players
Eredivisie players
France youth international footballers
France under-21 international footballers
Monegasque expatriate footballers
French expatriate footballers
French expatriate sportspeople in the Netherlands
Expatriate footballers in the Netherlands